The Ufton Nervet rail crash was a collision between a train and car on a level crossing near Ufton Nervet, Berkshire, England, in 2004. Seven people, including the drivers of the train and the car, were killed. An inquest found that the crash was caused by the suicide of the car driver.

Four further fatal incidents occurred on the level crossing between 2004 and 2014. In 2016, a road bridge replaced the level crossing.

Collision

All eight coaches derailed and the rear of the  InterCity 125 train came to rest about  beyond the crossing. Seven people were killed in the crash: the car's driver, the driver of the train, and five of its passengers. Official estimates put the number of people on board at 180 to 200. About half of these were injured, 12 of them seriously. Eleven people were cut free from the wreckage. The high structural integrity of the Mark 3 coaches prevented a much higher death toll, plus the fact that the more lightly loaded first-class coaches were at the leading end of the train.

More than 20 ambulances from five counties and 14 fire engines attended the crash. Injured passengers were first helped at the Winning Hand pub,  to the north. After the collision survivors in some carriages used emergency hammers to break the train windows to escape. The accident occurred at night, and so passengers used emergency glow sticks and their mobile phones to provide some light. Sixty one injured passengers were taken variously to the Royal Berkshire Hospital in Reading and the North Hampshire Hospital in Basingstoke. Other passengers were treated at the scene and the pub for minor injuries.

The crash, investigation and necessary repairs blocked the direct railway between London and the southwest until the morning of 16 November 2004. The line reopened under temporary speed restrictions to allow the bedding in of ballast. Leading power car 43019 was written off.

Background
Other than the train driver's line of sight, which is less effective at night, railway signalling control and train drivers have no means of knowing whether a level crossing of this type is clear. Half barriers close the crossing to road traffic but allow any road user on the crossing to escape without the need for a local controller to raise the barriers.

Site
Most of the surrounding land is rural including all of the land immediately by the railway.

List of fatalities
 Stanley Martin, 54, of Torquay, Devon (the train driver)
 Anjanette Rossi, 38, of Speen, Berkshire (the mother of Louella Main)
 Louella Main, 9, of Speen, Berkshire (the daughter of Anjanette Rossi)
 Charlie Matthews, 72, of Warminster, Wiltshire
 Barry Strevens, 55, of Wells, Somerset
 Emily Webster, 14, of Doccombe, Moretonhampstead, Devon
 Brian Drysdale, 48, of Reading, Berkshire (the car driver)

Investigation
An investigation was carried out by Thames Valley Police and British Transport Police. A preliminary report by the Health and Safety Executive indicated that the car stopped on the level crossing before any warnings and failed to react to the barrier alarm sequence. A minor deflection of the stationary car to one side by the train derailed the forward bogie, which continued to travel at about 25° to the rails until reaching the points at the start of a loop. At this point the power car derailed completely, causing the remainder of the train to derail.

The Rail Safety and Standards Board (RSSB) published a preliminary report on 1 February 2005 that stated:
 The automatic half-barrier equipment and its associated ancillary equipment is in good condition and properly maintained.
 The train driver shut off power and coasted for around four seconds, which was normal for this point in the journey. He then applied the emergency brakes at or about the time of impact with the car.
 All lighting was lost in all the coaches during the accident. As a result, passengers and crew found orientation difficult, though the provision of glow sticks alleviated this to some extent. Some passengers who attempted to break windows in order to escape from the vehicle were hampered by the emergency hammers breaking, and by the difficulty of reaching the upper windows of a vehicle leaning heavily to one side.
 No evidence had been presented that the maintenance condition of the train contributed in any way to the derailment or exacerbated its consequences.
 No evidence had been presented to the inquiry that would indicate there were any deficiencies in the fitness for duty on the part of the staff of either Network Rail or First Great Western.

The RSSB report made recommendations including improving emergency communications at the level crossing and moving a set of points whose position was a factor in the train's derailment. Network Rail implemented all the safety recommendations.

On 1 June 2005 it was announced that an inquest into the crash would be held at the Guildhall in Windsor, Berkshire. The inquest was expected to last 12 days, starting on 17 October 2005. A delay ensued over whether the families of the victims should be granted legal aid. The inquest finally began in October 2007. A policeman who had witnessed the crash, PC Brazier, testified at the inquest. He told the jury that he believed the crash was caused by a suicide attempt. The Forensic Accident Investigator, David Price, told the inquest that he had been able to determine that the car had been parked on the level crossing with its engine switched off, the handbrake fully applied, the vehicle's lights switched off, the steering on a partial left-hand turn (which was not consistent with driving across the crossing), and that its fuel tank still contained at least  of petrol.

On 1 November 2007 the inquest returned the verdict that the crash was caused by Brian Drysdale's suicide.
A support network, the Ufton Nervet Train Crash Network, was set up for survivors and relatives of the victims.

Subsequent events

Royal Humane Society awards
In 2005 the Royal Humane Society awarded its bronze medal to two passengers who were on the train: salesman Brian Kemsley and Royal Marines company sergeant major Tom McPhee. The two men found nine-year-old Louella Main and her mother Anjanette Rossi, both of whom had been thrown out of the train by the force of the crash. Rossi was dead but Kemsley testified to the 2007 inquest:

Despite the men's efforts Main died of her injuries. Kemsley then found a clergyman who had been a passenger on the train, and got him to walk back to the bodies to say a prayer. McPhee also found injured passenger Sharmin Bacchus trapped in the wreckage, and kept her conscious until she was freed.

Memorial

Beside the level crossing a small area of reflection has been created with two wooden benches facing an engraved steel memorial plaque remembering all people affected by the collision. Also, on what would have been his 55th birthday, First Great Western named power car 43139 after the driver of the train. A plaque at the memorial reads:

Replacement bridge
In July 2012 an Internet petition called for the level crossing to be replaced with a bridge. Network Rail subsequently announced that it was considering either converting the crossing to full barriers or a bridge. West Berkshire Council approved plans for a road bridge in August 2015, and preparatory work began the following month. Construction began in April 2016, and the bridge was officially opened on 16 December 2016.

Further incidents
After the 2004 crash there were deaths at the crossing in 2009, 2010, 2012 and 2014. The 2010 death was found not suspicious. The coroner's inquest into the 2012 death recorded an open verdict as there was insufficient evidence to be certain that that fatality was the result of suicide.
The 2012 collision also caused injury to the InterCity 125 driver. British Transport Police concluded that the circumstances surrounding the 2014 fatality were not suspicious.

There was a near miss at the same level crossing on 4 September 2011. The Rail Accident Investigation Branch investigated the cause, which was found to be an error by a signaller working in a central location who failed to contact the train driver and the attendant at the crossing. This failure was likely due to work overload of the signaller.

See also
 List of British rail accidents
 2005 Glendale train crash

References

External links
 BBC reporter eyewitness report – BBC News
 Seven train crash dead are named – BBC News
 Ufton Nervet crash victim recalls horror – ten years on – Newbury Weekly News
 Preliminary Coroner's summary – corporateaccountability.org
 Preliminary Health & Safety Exec. Report – PDF
 Rail Safety & Standards Board inquiry – PDF
 First Great Western press release– PDF 

2004 disasters in the United Kingdom
2004 in the United Kingdom
2004 in England
2004 road incidents
2000s in Berkshire
Accidents and incidents involving First Great Western
Disasters in Berkshire
Level crossing incidents in the United Kingdom
Murder–suicides in the United Kingdom
Suicides by train
Rail transport in Berkshire
Railway accidents in 2004
Railway accidents and incidents in Berkshire
Road incidents in England
Transport in Berkshire
November 2004 events in the United Kingdom
Ufton Nervet